El Fuerte (Spanish: "The Fort") may refer to:

 El Fuerte de Samaipata, a UNESCO World Heritage Site in Bolivia
 El Fuerte, Sinaloa, a city of Sinaloa, Mexico
 El Fuerte, a character in the Street Fighter video game series

Fuerte may also refer to:

 "bolívar fuerte", the official name of the Venezuelan bolívar
 Fuerte River, a river in Sinaloa, Mexico
 Fuerte, a variety of avocado
 "Fuerte" (song), a song by Nelly Furtado
 Fuerte (album), by Miranda!
 "Fuerte", a song by Belinda included in Belinda (Belinda Peregrín album)
 "Fuerte", a Fanny Lu song
 Fuerte, one of the names used in various times and places for the Peso coin